January 2 - Eastern Orthodox liturgical calendar - January 4

All fixed commemorations below are observed on January 16 by Eastern Orthodox Churches on the Old Calendar.

For January 3rd, Orthodox Churches on the Old Calendar commemorate the Saints listed on December 21.

Feasts
 Forefeast of the Theophany of Our Lord and Savior Jesus Christ.

Saints
 Holy Prophet Malachi (c. 400 BC) 
 Martyr Peter, in Avlona of Samaria, Palestine (311) 
 Martyr Gordius, at Caesarea in Cappadocia, centurion, by the sword (c. 314)
 Venerable Meliton of Beirut (537) 
 Venerable Peter of Atroa (Peter the Standard-Bearer) (837)  (see also: September 13, January 1 - Western Rite)
 Venerable Acacius the Wonderworker, of Mount Latros (Latmos), at the Megisti Lavra of the Theotokos of Myrsinon (c. 10th century)
 Saint Thomais of Lesbos (10th century)

Pre-Schism Western saints
 Hieromartyr Daniel of Padua, a Deacon who helped St Prosdocimus, the first Bishop of Padua in Italy (168)
 Saint Anterus, Pope of Rome (236)  ( see also August 5 - Eastern Calendar)
 Hieromartyr Florentius of Vienne, a martyred Bishop of Vienne in France (3rd century) 
 Venerable Genevieve of Paris (502) 
 Saint Fintan of Doon, a disciple of St Comgall at Bangor in Ireland; he is honoured as the patron-saint of Doon in Limerick where his holy well still exists (6th century)
 Saint Finlugh of Derry (Finlag), a brother of St Fintan of Doon, he went to Scotland where he became one of St Columba's disciples; returning to Ireland, he became abbot of a monastery in County Londonderry (6th century)
 Saint Blitmund, a monk at Bobbio Abbey in Italy (c. 660)
 Saint Bertilia of Mareuil, anchoress (c. 687)
 Saint Findlugan of Islay (Finlaggan, Fionn Lugain) (7th century)
 Saint Wenog, an early saint in Wales.

Post-Schism Orthodox saints
 Righteous Euthymius (Takaishvili) the Man of God, of Tbilisi (1953)

Other commemorations
 Repose of Schema-Hierodeacon Elder Panteleimon, founder of Kostychev Convent (1884)

Icon gallery

Notes

References

Sources
 January 3/January 16. Orthodox Calendar (PRAVOSLAVIE.RU).
 January 16 / January 3. HOLY TRINITY RUSSIAN ORTHODOX CHURCH (A parish of the Patriarchate of Moscow).
 January 3. OCA - The Lives of the Saints.
 The Autonomous Orthodox Metropolia of Western Europe and the Americas (ROCOR). St. Hilarion Calendar of Saints for the year of our Lord 2004. St. Hilarion Press (Austin, TX). pp. 4–5.
 January 3. Latin Saints of the Orthodox Patriarchate of Rome.
 The Roman Martyrology. Transl. by the Archbishop of Baltimore. Last Edition, According to the Copy Printed at Rome in 1914. Revised Edition, with the Imprimatur of His Eminence Cardinal Gibbons. Baltimore: John Murphy Company, 1916. pp. 4–5.
Greek Sources
 Great Synaxaristes:  3 ΙΑΝΟΥΑΡΙΟΥ. ΜΕΓΑΣ ΣΥΝΑΞΑΡΙΣΤΗΣ.
  Συναξαριστής. 3 Ιανουαρίου. ECCLESIA.GR. (H ΕΚΚΛΗΣΙΑ ΤΗΣ ΕΛΛΑΔΟΣ). 
Russian Sources
  16 января (3 января). Православная Энциклопедия под редакцией Патриарха Московского и всея Руси Кирилла (электронная версия). (Orthodox Encyclopedia - Pravenc.ru).
  3 января (ст.ст.) 16 января 2013 (нов. ст.) . Русская Православная Церковь Отдел внешних церковных связей. (DECR).

January in the Eastern Orthodox calendar